Saltillo Independent School District (Saltillo ISD) is a public school district based in the community of Saltillo, Texas (USA).

Located in east central Hopkins County, the district includes a small portion of Franklin County.

Saltillo ISD has one school that serves students in grades Pre-Kindergarten though twelve.

In 2009, the school district was rated "recognized" by the Texas Education Agency.

References

External links
Saltillo ISD

School districts in Hopkins County, Texas
School districts in Franklin County, Texas